Olivehurst (formerly, Denniston) is a census-designated place (CDP) in Yuba County, California, United States. The population was 13,656 at the 2010 census, up from 11,061 at the 2000 census.

History
Olivehurst was first largely settled by people from the Midwest during the Great Depression who were looking for fertile land, availability of jobs and a better future. People from the town have been known to refer to this group of people as "Okies", a term originally for those from Oklahoma who were escaping the "dust bowl" Oklahoma had become during the Great Depression. This is why some of the streets are named after cities in Oklahoma. These "Okies" were following migrant workers such as those of Chinese, Japanese, Filipino, Mexican and Native American background.

The economy has been largely focused on agriculture, but, since the 1950s, jobs have been increasingly focused on mill and manufacturing work. Today's economy is centered on a "commuter economy" where many of the residents work outside of the town.

A post office opened at Olivehurst in 1941.

Olivehurst was the site of the Lindhurst High School shooting in 1992, which left four dead.

Geography

According to the United States Census Bureau, the CDP has a total area of 7.5 square miles (19.4 km), all of it land.

Demographics

2010
At the 2010 census Olivehurst had a population of 13,656. The population density was ). The racial make-up was 8,534 (62.5%) White, 322 (2.4%) African American, 399 (2.9%) Native American, 772 (5.7%) Asian, 61 (0.4%) Pacific Islander, 2,623 (19.2%) from other races and 945 (6.9%) from two or more races. Hispanic or Latino of any race were 4,994 persons (36.6%).

The census reported that 13,610 people (99.7% of the population) lived in households, 46 (0.3%) lived in non-institutionalized group quarters and no one was institutionalized.
There were 4,120 households, of which 1,961 (47.6%) had children under the age of 18 living in them, 2,137 (51.9%) were opposite-sex married couples living together, 713 (17.3%) had a female householder with no husband present and 316 (7.7%) had a male householder with no wife present. There were 380 (9.2%) unmarried opposite-sex partnerships and 29 (0.7%) same-sex married couples or partnerships. 726 households (17.6%) were one person and 243 (5.9%) had someone living alone who was 65 or older. The average household size was 3.30. There were 3,166 families (76.8% of households); the average family size was 3.71.

The age distribution was 4,339 people (31.8%) under the age of 18, 1,469 people (10.8%) aged 18 to 24, 3,767 people (27.6%) aged 25 to 44, 2,937 people (21.5%) aged 45 to 64, and 1,144 people (8.4%) who were 65 or older. The median age was 29.9 years. For every 100 females, there were 100.5 males.  For every 100 females age 18 and over, there were 99.5 males.

Of the occupied units, 2,538 (61.6%) were owner-occupied and 1,582 (38.4%) were rented. The homeowner vacancy rate was 3.8%; the rental vacancy rate was 5.0%. 8,029 people (58.8% of the population) lived in owner-occupied housing units and 5,581 people (40.9%) lived in rental housing units.

2000
At the 2000 census there were 11,061 people, 3,474 households and 2,650 families in the CDP. The racial make-up of the CDP was 67.29% White, 1.65% African American, 3.67% Native American, 5.06% Asian, 0.17% Pacific Islander, 15.52% from other races and 6.63% from two or more races. Hispanic or Latino of any race were 24.95%.

Of the 3,474 households, 41.5% had children under the age of 18 living with them, 54.2% were married couples living together, 15.8% had a female householder with no husband present, and 23.7% were non-families. 18.4% of households were one person and 7.4% were one person aged 65 or older. The average household size was 3.17 and the average family size was 3.58.

The age distribution was 33.5% under the age of 18, 9.8% from 18 to 24, 28.1% from 25 to 44, 19.1% from 45 to 64, and 9.5% 65 or older. The median age was 30 years. For every 100 females, there were 101.9 males. For every 100 females age 18 and over, there were 99.4 males.

The median household income was $29,854 and the median family income was $32,072. Males had a median income of $27,123 and females $21,980. The per capita income was $12,020. About 13.3% of families and 18.3% of the population were below the poverty line, including 23.1% of those under age 18 and 7.4% of those age 65 or over.

Government

Education
Olivehurst is served by Marysville Joint Unified School District. There are several elementary schools located in the town in addition to Lindhurst High School, one of the two in the district.

Notable people
 Phil Baugh - musician

References

External links
Olivehurst on the Yuba-Sutter local wiki

Census-designated places in Yuba County, California
Census-designated places in California